The Paraguay national beach soccer team represents Paraguay in international beach soccer competitions and is controlled by the APF, the governing body for football in Paraguay. The team debuted in 2013 at the FIFA Beach Soccer World Cup and has been classified since then in all editions as of 2017. Regionally, Paraguay has been one of the strongest teams in South America since 2013.

They are locally known as Pynandi, which is translated as 'barefoot' from guarani language.

Results and fixtures

The following is a list of match results in the last 12 months, as well as any future matches that have been scheduled.

Legend

2022

Players

Current squad
The following players and staff members were called up for the 2021 FIFA Beach Soccer World Cup.

Head coach: Joaquin Molas
Assistant coach: Eduardo Gonzalez

Competitive record

FIFA Beach Soccer World Cup

FIFA Beach Soccer World Cup qualification (CONMEBOL)

South American Games/Beach Games

Beach Soccer Intercontinental Cup

Bolivarian Beach Games

References

External links
Paraguay at BSWW
 Paraguay at Beach Soccer Russia 

South American national beach soccer teams
Beach Soccer